Manoj Pratim Samanta is an Indian-American scientist and engineer working in the field of bioinformatics.

Samanta became interested in mathematics at a young age, and was a member of India's team in the 1989 International Mathematical Olympiad. He subsequently graduated from the Indian Institute of Technology, where he received the institute silver medal. In 1998, he received his Ph.D. in electrical engineering from Purdue University under the supervision of Supriyo Datta. He later conducted research on superconductors before becoming interested in biological systems. He is the founder of the Systemix Institute, a genomics research company based in Redmond, Washington. He formerly worked at NASA's Ames Research Center and Hewlett-Packard. He is also the co-founder of Coding4Medicine, an organization aimed at training young people in computational biology, and maintains the blog Homolog.us.

References

External links
Homolog.us

Living people
Purdue University College of Engineering alumni
Indian bioinformaticians
Indian emigrants to the United States
Indian electrical engineers
Indian Institutes of Technology alumni
Indian bloggers
Science bloggers
Ames Research Center
Year of birth missing (living people)